Manalur is a small village in Thrissur district of Kerala state, south India. It is one of the constituencies in Thrissur district.

Demographics
 India census, Manalur had a population of 17130 with 8237 males and 8893 females.

Politics
Manalur assembly constituency is part of Trichur (Lok Sabha constituency).

Organic Farming
Manalur is famous for organic farming.  When the Indian prime minister visited Manalur in 2016, food for 3,000 strong audience was prepared in Manalur using organic farming techniques.

References

Personages

Colonel Sreeghanlal P. Raman, First Senior Indian Army officer and pilot from the area, belongs to Manalur panchayat.

Krishnan Kaniyamparambil- An Indian politician and Kerala Minister of Agriculture from 09 June 1997 to 13 May 2001.

Cities and towns in Thrissur district